Loy Wesley Henderson (June 28, 1892 – March 24, 1986) was a United States Foreign Service Officer and diplomat.

Background
Loy Wesley Henderson was born on June 28, 1892, in Rogers, Arkansas, to a poor Methodist preacher. He attended college in a small town in Kansas before transferring to Northwestern University.

Career

Early career
An arm injury prevented Henderson from fighting in World War I, so he served as a Red Cross volunteer instead.

In 1922, Henderson joined the United States Foreign Service.

Eastern Europe and USSR

After an initial consular tour in Ireland, Henderson began a 24-year focus on Soviet and Eastern European Affairs. He then investigated the connection between the Soviet Comintern and left wing organizations in the United States while serving in Latvia, Lithuania, and Estonia.

In 1933, the Roosevelt Administration extended diplomatic recognition to the Soviet Union and Henderson was assigned to Russia to help reopen the U.S. Embassy in Moscow. Aiding him in this task were fellow junior officers George F. Kennan and Charles Bohlen, who along with Henderson would later be considered the Department's top Soviet specialists. In 1935, the Kremlin broke its pledge to not to interfere in U. S. domestic politics. In response, Ambassador Bullitt returned to Washington in disgust, leaving Henderson for a time as chargé d'affaires in Moscow. As chargé, Henderson warned Washington that the Soviet Union was likely to cooperate with Nazi Germany. Four years later, Moscow signed the Soviet-German Non-aggression Pact of 1939. Henderson was one of the contributors to the Welles declaration of 1940, which established US non recognition policy of Baltic states occupation by Soviet Union.

Henderson deeply distrusted the Kremlin and was at odds with the enthusiasm most Americans—and President Roosevelt—had in early 1942 for their new Soviet wartime allies. On the occasion of the third anniversary of the establishment of diplomatic relations between the United States and the Soviet Union, however, he submitted In a memorandum as Chargé in the Soviet Union to the Secretary of State, Hull, dated  November 16, 1936 a description of the failure of the last years giving a lot place to the arguments of the Soviet side to raise a better understanding.  Nevertheless Eleanor Roosevelt and other Soviet sympathizers in the White House pressured the State Department to transfer Henderson out of the Soviet section. As a result, Henderson was sent to Baghdad as the U.S. ambassador to Iraq.  "A man of the highest character, absolutely incorruptible....Overruled time after time, he asked in 1943 to be relieved of his duties as chief of the division".

Near Eastern Affairs

In between serving as U.S. Minister in Iraq (1943–45), Ambassador to India (1948–51) and Ambassador to Iran (1951–54), Henderson returned to Washington in 1945 to serve at the State Department as the director of the Office of Near Eastern Affairs.

In 1945, Syrians in Damascus led an uprising against French rule. In response, French forces bombed Damascus. Henderson, as head of Near Eastern Affairs, advised President Harry Truman to force the French to withdraw. Henderson argued that the French bombing undermined not only the newly created United Nations but also the West's relations with the Arab world. Henderson correctly predicted that if the West did not maintain close relations with Syria, it would fall into the Soviet sphere.

In early 1946, Soviet troops advanced south to the outskirts of Tabriz in northwestern Iran, sparking an early Cold War stand-off known as the Iran crisis. Henderson showed the Truman administration how such movements threatened Turkey, Iraq, and the Iranian oil fields. Following Henderson's advice, Truman issued a stern warning to Stalin. Stalin thereafter pulled back his troops.

Henderson came under fierce criticism from San Francisco attorney Bartley Crum.  Crum had served on the Anglo-American Committee of Inquiry.  Crum named Henderson as a symbol of State Department duplicity in supporting the Arab cause in Palestine.

In late 1946, the Kremlin attempted to bully Ankara into ceding territory in eastern Turkey and control of the Dardanelles, which would have given Moscow its long-desired warm water port. Henderson, with Acting Secretary of State Dean Acheson, convinced Truman to express support for Turkey and to dispatch navy units to the eastern Mediterranean. In response, the Soviets withdrew some of their demands.

In 1947, the British embassy in Washington informed Henderson that the United Kingdom was no longer able to bolster the pro-Western forces against the Communist agitators in the Greek Civil War. Once again, Henderson convinced Truman to actively defend Western interests in the Mediterranean against Soviet encroachment. Henderson designed the Truman Doctrine plans to strengthen Greece and Turkey, an early move which would influence U.S. containment policy for decades to come.

In 1948, Henderson clashed with domestic groups lobbying for the creation of the state of Israel. Secretary of State George C. Marshall and Henderson, speaking for the Department of State, opposed the United Nations resolution dividing Palestine into Jewish and Arab states, as they felt Israel would not be able to defend itself and would ruin Washington's relationships with the Arab world; their view was that the area should remain a trust under the UN. On the other side, Presidential advisors such as David Niles and Clark Clifford, along with American Jewish groups and much of the general public, favored the partition of Palestine into the State of Israel and an Arab state. Henderson was harshly criticized for his opposition to the creation of Israel. His views did not prevail in 1948 and his transfer to the ambassadorship for India was rumored by his supporters to have been the result of political pressure from the pro-Zionist groups. In 1954, he was appointed as Assistant Secretary of State for Administration. 

Henderson returned to the Middle East in 1951 as Ambassador to Iran. There he dealt with the newly elected prime minister, Mohammed Mossadegh, on questions associated with Iran's oil reserves previously owned by British interests that Mossadegh had recently nationalized. The United States was opposed to the nationalization, and he helped orchestrate the 1953 CIA-assisted coup which removed Mossadegh, a democratically elected leader. In 1956, he was named a Career Ambassador.

He retired in 1960 and spent seven years teaching International Relations at Washington, D.C.'s American University. His memoirs, entitled "A Question of Trust: the origins of U.S.-Soviet diplomatic relations" were published in 1986.

Death

Henderson died at 93 on March 24, 1986 in a Bethesda, Maryland, nursing home.

Legacy

A conference room in the State Department headquarters, the Harry S Truman Building, is named in his honor.

Career summary

References

Further reading
 Brands, H. W. Inside the Cold War: Loy Henderson and the Rise of the American Empire, 1918–1961 (Oxford University Press, 1991). 
 Henderson, Loy Wesley. A Question of Trust: The Origins of US-Soviet Diplomatic Relations: the Memoirs of Loy W. Henderson (Hoover Institution Press, 1986), a primary source online

 Jones, Kenneth Paul, ed. U.S. Diplomats in Europe, 1919–41 (ABC-CLIO. 1981) online on Henderson's role with USSR Europe, pp 149–164.
 Kuniholm, Bruce R. "Loy Henderson, Dean Acheson, and the Origins of the Truman Doctrine." in Dean Acheson and the Making of US Foreign Policy (Palgrave Macmillan, London, 1993) pp. 73-108.

External links
The Political Graveyard - Short summary of details.
Loy W. Henderson: A Register of His Papers in the Library of Congress
Oral history interviewfrom 1973 at the Harry S. Truman Library.
Memoirs of Loy W. Henderson in the Library of Congress
A brief biography by William N. Dale 

1892 births
1986 deaths
People from Rogers, Arkansas
Northwestern University alumni
Ambassadors of the United States to India
Ambassadors of the United States to Iran
Ambassadors of the United States to Iraq
United States Career Ambassadors
Recipients of the President's Award for Distinguished Federal Civilian Service
20th-century American diplomats